"The Game (You'll Never Walk Alone)" is a single by the industrial hip-hop group Tackhead, released in 1987 on 4th & B'way Records.

Formats and track listing 
All songs written by Oscar Hammerstein, Keith LeBlanc, Richard Rodgers, Adrian Sherwood and Doug Wimbish
UK 12" single (12BRW 65)
"The Game (You'll Never Walk Alone)" (feat. Brian Moore) – 4:43
"The Game (You'll Never Walk Alone)" (instrumental chants) – 3:00
"The Game (You'll Never Walk Alone)" (feat. Ronnie and Margaret) – 3:43
"The Game (You'll Never Walk Alone)" (Political mix) – 3:59

UK 7" single (BRW 65)
"The Game (You'll Never Walk Alone)" (feat. Brian Moore) (edit) – 3:54
"The Game (You'll Never Walk Alone)" (feat. Ronnie and Margaret) – 3:43

US 12" single (BWAY 445)
"The Game (You'll Never Walk Alone)" (dub version) – 3:40
"The Game (You'll Never Walk Alone)" (Political mix) – 3:59
"The Game (You'll Never Walk Alone)" (full-time instrumental) – 6:24

1989 Australian 12" single (ATACK 121)
"The Game (You'll Never Walk Alone)" (feat. Brian Moore) – 4:43
"The Game (You'll Never Walk Alone)" (instrumental chants) – 3:00
"The Game (You'll Never Walk Alone)" (feat. Brian Moore) (edit) – 3:54
"The Game (You'll Never Walk Alone)" (Political mix) – 3:59
"The Game (You'll Never Walk Alone)" (dub version) – 3:40

Personnel 

Tackhead
Keith LeBlanc – drums, percussion
Skip McDonald – guitar
Adrian Sherwood – sampler, programming
Doug Wimbish – bass guitar

Technical personnel
Tackhead – producer

Charts

References

External links 
 

1987 songs
1987 singles
4th & B'way Records singles
Tackhead songs
Songs written by Doug Wimbish
Songs with music by Richard Rodgers
Songs with lyrics by Oscar Hammerstein II